James Alfred Thurgood (21 June 1876 – 31 July 1946) was an Australian rules footballer who played with Essendon in the Victorian Football League (VFL).

Family
The son of James Thurgood (1841-1923), and Elizabeth Thurgood (1844-1894), née Weir, James Alfred Thurgood was born in Hotham, now known as North Melbourne, Victoria on 21 June 1876.

He was the cousin of Essendon great Albert Thurgood.

He married Ethel Dalkin (1876-1959) on 16 April 1908.

Football
He made his debut for Essendon in the match against Fitzroy on 29 May 1897. He scored two goals, one of which "[was] a magnificent long angled shot, which fairly staggered the spectators". His cousin, Albert Thurgood, who also played for Essendon, was described as the “first icon of football”.

Death
He died at Malvern, Victoria on 31 July 1946.

Notes

References
 
 Maplestone, M., Flying Higher: History of the Essendon Football Club 1872–1996, Essendon Football Club, (Melbourne), 1996.

External links 

1876 births
1946 deaths
Australian rules footballers from Melbourne
Essendon Football Club players
People from North Melbourne